Kintingka kurutjutu is a species of beetle in the family Dytiscidae, the only species in the genus Kintingka.

References

Dytiscidae genera
Monotypic Adephaga genera